The Eurasian lynx is the target of ongoing species reintroduction proposals in Great Britain. Proposed locations include the Scottish Highlands and Kielder Forest in Northumberland, England.

Background
Lynx were extirpated from the island of Great Britain by the Middle Ages, and since the extinction of the grey wolf, the island contains no terrestrial apex predators.

Since then, deer populations have increased dramatically due to having no natural predators; with excessive deer foraging leading to prevention of forest regeneration, the stripping of tree vegetation, and removing of the shrub layer in forests, which provides a habitat for birds such as nightingales and willow warblers. Reintroducing large predators such as the lynx are seen by rewilding experts as a means of restoring balance in the ecosystem and keeping deer numbers under control.

Proposals

England
Lynx Trust UK are a registered charity campaigning for the reintroduction of lynx to the Kielder Forest in Northumberland. In 2018, a proposal to release six animals was turned down by then-Environment Secretary Michael Gove, due to findings that the proposal did not "meet the necessary standards set out in the IUCN (International Union for Conservation of Nature) guidelines and fails to give confidence that the project could be completed in practical terms or that the outputs would meet the stated aims". In 2020 the Trust began preparing a second proposal to be submitted, with three animals proposed.

The Wild East Project has proposed lynx reintroduction to areas of East Anglia.

Scotland
Lynx reintroduction into the Scottish Highlands has been proposed since 2008, and a study by Lynx Trust UK and the University of Lancaster found that the Scottish countryside would be able to support a population of up to 250 animals. In 2020, Lynx Trust UK began a consultation into releasing lynx into the Queen Elizabeth Forest Park north of Glasgow.

Support
The proposals have met opposition from sheep farmers, citing threats the lynx would pose to their flocks; despite research indicating that because lynx also predate on foxes, the number of lambs killed would reduce.

Tony Juniper, chairman of Natural England, voiced his support for the "inspiring" proposal in 2020, stating that it could help to cut deer numbers. Scottish rewilding charity Trees for Life supports lynx reintroduction, claiming it would "restore ecological processes that have been missing for centuries, and provide a free and efficient deer management service".

See also
 List of extinct animals of the British Isles

References

External links
 Eurasian Lynx - Lynx Trust UK

Animal reintroduction
Conservation in the United Kingdom
Wildlife of the United Kingdom